Lanžov is a municipality and village in Trutnov District in the Hradec Králové Region of the Czech Republic. It has about 200 inhabitants.

Administrative parts
Villages and hamlets of Lhotka, Miřejov, Sedlec and Záborov are administrative parts of Lanžov.

References

Villages in Trutnov District